Gangashetty Arvind Kumar (born 4 October 1973) is an Indian former cricketer. He played 43 first-class matches for Hyderabad between 1994 and 2004.

See also
 List of Hyderabad cricketers

References

External links
 

1973 births
Living people
Indian cricketers
Hyderabad cricketers
Cricketers from Hyderabad, India